Steenstrupdalen is a valley in Nathorst Land at Spitsbergen, Svalbard. It is named after Danish geologist Knud Johannes Vogelius Steenstrup.
The valley is surrounded by the mountains of Otto Pettersonfjellet, Marlowfjellet and Brogniartfjella. The glaciers of Sysselmannbreen and Steenstrupbreen end up into the valley.

References

Valleys of Spitsbergen